The rodent family Platacanthomyidae, or Oriental dormice, includes the spiny dormice and the Chinese pygmy dormice.  In spite of their appearance, these animals are not true dormice, but are part of the large and complex superfamily Muroidea.  The platacanthomyids can be distinguished from the true dormice, because they have no premolars, giving them three cheek teeth, like their relatives, the Muroidea.

The evolutionary relationship of the Platacanthomyidae was uncertain until a molecular phylogenetic study found it to be the earliest extant lineage to branch within the superfamily Muroidea. They can be distinguished from both the family Spalacidae and the Eumuroida (all non-spalacid and non-platacanthomyid muroids), by the distinct shape of their infraorbital canal and by the presence of multiple openings in the palate of the skull.  On the basis of these two characteristics, they have been considered to be distinct from all other muroids.  More work is needed to determine the evolutionary position of this subfamily.

The Platacanthomyidae contain three genera – Neocometes, Platacanthomys (spiny dormice), and Typhlomys (pygmy dormice) – but only three extant species.

Taxonomy
Family Platacanthomyidae
Genus †Neocometes
†Neocometes brunonis
†Neocometes orientalis
†Neocometes similis
Genus Platacanthomys (spiny dormice)
†Platacanthomys dianensis
Platacanthomys lasiurus (spiny dormouse)
Genus Typhlomys (pygmy dormice)
Typhlomys cinereus (Chinese pygmy dormouse)
Typhlomys nanus
†Typhlomys hipparionium
†Typhlomys intermedius
†Typhlomys macrourus
†Typhlomys primitivus

References

Further reading
 Musser, G. G. and M. D. Carleton. 2005. Superfamily Muroidea. pp. 894–1531 in Mammal Species of the World a Taxonomic and Geographic Reference. D. E. Wilson and D. M. Reeder eds. Johns Hopkins University Press, Baltimore.
 Norris, R. W., K. Y. Zhou, C. Q. Zhou, G. Yang, C. W. Kilpatrick, and R. L. Honeycutt. 2004. The phylogenetic position of the zokors (Myospalacinae) and comments on the families of muroids (Rodentia). Molecular Phylogenetics and Evolution, 31:972-978.
 Nowak, R. M. 1999. Walker's Mammals of the World, Vol. 2. Johns Hopkins University Press, London. 
 Steppan, S. J., R. A. Adkins, and J. Anderson. 2004. Phylogeny and divergence date estimates of rapid radiations in muroid rodents based on multiple nuclear genes. Systematic Biology, 53:533-553.

Muroid rodents
 
Rodent families
Extant Miocene first appearances
Taxa named by Edward Richard Alston